Robert Colchin (1713 – 1750) was an English cricketer and match organiser of the mid-Georgian period at a time when the single wicket version of the game was popular. His exact date and place of birth is unknown but he was christened at Chailey, Sussex, on 12 November 1713. He died at Deptford and was buried at Bromley in Kent in April 1750.

Life and career
Colchin lived in Bromley for several years and was associated with the local Bromley Cricket Club, which was prominent through the 1740s and declined after his death. Widely known as "Long Robin" because he was tall, he was considered to have been one of the best batters of his day. In addition to his prowess as a single wicket player, Colchin played for Kent in eleven-a-side matches, including the celebrated match against England at the Artillery Ground in July 1744. Colchin had strong associations with the Artillery Ground and is known to have promoted many matches there, often fielding his own team.

Personality
According to a contemporary article about Colchin in The Connoisseur (no. 132, dated 1746): "his greatest excellence is cricket-playing, in which he is reckoned as good a bat as either of (Little or Tall Bennett); and is at length arrived at the supreme dignity of being distinguished among his brethren of the wicket by the title of Long Robin". The article also said Colchin's favourite amusement was attending the executions at Tyburn and that, whereas he had been "born and bred a gentleman, (he) has taken great pains to degrade himself, and is now as complete a blackguard as those whom he has chosen for his companions".

Death
Colchin died on 29 April 1750, aged 36. He had taken part in an athletics race on 9 April and a contemporary report said he developed a "surfeit" doing that "which threw him into the Small-Pox".

References

Bibliography

External links

1713 births
1750 deaths
English cricketers
English cricketers of 1701 to 1786
Kent cricketers
Non-international England cricketers
Single wicket cricketers